Anna Susanna is an East German drama film directed by Richard Nicolas. It was released in 1953.

Plot
During the Great Depression, a rich businessman named Brinkmann decides sink his ship, Anna Susanna, so he would be compensated by the insurance. He orders its captain, Kleiers, to sabotage it while at sea. When Kleiers carries out his instructions, several sailors and passengers notice him. In a fight that ensues, the captain is killed, but not before he manage to shipwreck Anna Susanna. Only a handful of people survive the incident. After they return home, they discover that Brinkmann's insurance fraud worked and he was compensated. They sue him at court and manage to have him indicted.

Cast
 Günther Simon as  Orje
 Peter Marx as  Fietje
 Werner Peters as  Kuddel
 Harry Hindemith as  Emil
 Herbert Richter as Kleiers
 Alfred Maack as  Peer Frensen
 Maly Delschaft as  Kuddel's mother
 Aribert Grimmer as  Kuddel's father
 Arno Paulsen as  Jan Brödel
 Werner Pledath as  Brinkmann
 Fritz Wagner as  Uwe Frahm
 Hans Olaf Moser as  Wesener
 Klaus Dirks as  Lütt Heini
 Lothar Firmans as  Van Diemen
 Jürgen Grundling as Jochen-Jürgen
 Friedrich Kühne as Kröger

Production
During 1952, as the government control over DEFA tightened, the studio produced only six films, all of them influenced by the Cold War and dedicated to the ideological struggle between capitalism and socialism. Anna Susanna was one of those. Although the film had a plot suiting the government's policy, the DEFA Board was very reluctant to allow Richard Nicolas, for whom the picture was his debut as a director, to make Anna Susanna. Nicolas had threatened to resign if he would not be allowed to direct it, and was eventually granted permission. The film was also noted for being one of the first DEFA pictures to employ primitive special effects, such as building a miniature ship model that was wrecked in an aquarium.

Reception
Heinz Kersten quoted an East German official who told that "the times in which pictures like Anna Susanna, that damaged the image of DEFA in the eyes of the people... should not return." The West German Catholic Film Service described it as "rather well-developed, thrilling crime film... but filled with typical criticism of the capitalist system."

References

External links
 
Anna Susanna original poster on ostfilm.de.
Anna Susanna on cinema.de.
Anna Susanna on DEFA Foundation's website.
Anna Susanna on PROGRESS' website.

1953 films
1953 drama films
German drama films
DEFA films
1950s German-language films
German black-and-white films
Seafaring films
Great Depression films
1950s German films